Cobar is a town in central western New South Wales, Australia whose economy is based mainly upon base metals and gold mining. It is at the crossroads of the Kidman Way and Barrier Highway. The town and the local government area, the Cobar Shire, are on the eastern edge of the outback. At the 2016 census, the town of Cobar had a population of 3,990.

Many sights of cultural interest can be found in and around Cobar. The town retains much of its colonial 19th-century architecture. The Towsers Huts, 3 km south of town but currently inaccessible to the public, are ruins of very simple colonial dwellings from around 1870. The ancient Aboriginal rock paintings at Mount Grenfell are some of the largest and most important in Australia. The new Cobar Sound Chapel was opened in April 2022.

History

Indigenous origins

The Cobar area is part of the traditional territory of the Wongaibon people (within the Ngiyampaa language group associated with the arid plains and rocky hill country of the Central West area of NSW bordered by the Lachlan, Darling-Barwon and Bogan rivers). The name ‘Cobar’ is derived from a Ngiyampaa word – variously transcribed as kubbur, kuparr, gubarr or cuburra – for a water-hole and quarry where pigments of ochre, kaolin and blue and green copper minerals were mined for ceremonial use. Other sources claim the Aboriginal word means ‘red earth’ or ‘burnt earth’ (the ochre used for ceremonial body paint).

The Mount Grenfell Historic Site located north-west of Cobar is an important traditional meeting place with ceremonial significance.  Extensive rock art at the site contains ochre and kaolin paintings of human and animal figures as well as hand stencils.

Pastoralism
To the pastoralists who had taken up runs along the Darling River during the 1850s the Cobar area was a waterless region between rivers. As pastoral stations became more established, tanks and wells were constructed to allow stock to be grazed in areas away from permanent watercourses (known as ‘back stations).  By the mid-1860s back stations such as ‘Booroomugga’ and ‘Buckwaroon’ had been established in the Cobar locality (within the Warrego Pastoral District).

Copper ore

In September 1870 three contract well-sinkers, Charles Campbell, Thomas Hartman and George Gibb, were traveling south from Bourke to the Lachlan River. They had engaged two Aboriginal men, Frank and Boney, to guide them via the permanent watering places in the dry country between the rivers. Along the way they camped beside the Kubbur waterhole. The men noted the green and blue staining at the waterhole and collected some rock samples.  On their journey further south the well-sinkers stopped at a shanty operated by Henry Kruge (near to the future site of Gilgunnia). Kruge’s wife, Sidwell, was from Cornwall and her family had emigrated to South Australia in the late-1840s and mined copper ore at Burra. She was able to identify the rock as containing copper. Sidwell Kruge's assessment was confirmed when her husband smelted some of the ore samples in his blacksmith's forge. The three men then returned to Bourke, intending to secure the ground around the Kubbur waterhole. 

In partnership with Bourke businessman Joseph Becker, Campbell, Hartman and Gibb took up a mineral conditional purchase of 40 acres at the locality. Shortly afterwards the Cobar Copper Mining Company was formed, and the lease of the mine was transferred to the company. In May 1871 it was reported that there had been “a call for tenders for drawing in copper ore from Cobar”. In July 1871 a meeting was held in Bourke “of gentlemen interested in the Cobar copper mine” and shares were “eagerly bought at £15 per share”. By the following November it was reported that “the affairs of the Cobar Copper Mine Company are in a flourishing condition, shares having rushed up from £15 to £70 and £80 per share”.

In December 1871 a correspondent visited “the new Cobar copper mine” in company with Captain Lean, the newly-appointed mining manager. The mine had been in operation for the previous four months. It was situated “on a Pine ridge, and throughout the whole length of the ridge (about half-a-mile) indications of ore are apparent”. The ore was varied, “consisting of blue and red carbonate, red and black oxide, and is of very high quality”. The writer was of the opinion the Cobar mine “promises to be one of the richest copper mines Australia has yet produced”.

The South Cobar Mining Company built a furnace at Cobar and in May 1875 commenced smelting operations. Soon afterwards two additional furnaces and a refinery were built.  In December 1875 the Cobar Copper Mining Company amalgamated with the South Cobar Mining Company to form the Great Cobar Copper Mining Company Ltd. It and subsequent companies operated a number of light railways carrying ore and similar material, as well as timber for mine supports. Cobar and many mining outskirts accommodated the miners who travelled to the area in the late 1880s. The overwhelming majority of these were of Cornish Australian stock at the time.

Gold 
Although Cobar is best known as a copper mining area, it has also been a significant goldfield. The first significant gold producing mine at Cobar was the Chesney Mine. The New Occidental Mine is regarded as having been the most productive gold mine in New South Wales. Gold was also produced by refining the copper smelted from copper ores, this was first done in the Great Cobar electrolytic copper refinery at Lithgow.

Cobar township

In March 1881 the settlement at Cobar was described as “large and scattered, as mining towns generally are, composed chiefly of huts and cottages, which lie about in all directions and cover an extensive area of ground”. The population was estimated to number 2,500 consisting “principally of miners and their families”.  The township was “divided into three portions”, described as “the Government Township, the Private Township (or that upon the land taken up by or belonging to the company working the mine), and Cornish Town”, with “the mine and its appurtenances in the centre”. Most of the houses, places of business and public buildings were located in the Private Township.  In the surveyed Government Township there were “very few houses indeed”.  Cornish Town was described as “pretty thickly populated”.  The “want of water” was described as “the great drawback to the comfort of the inhabitants of Cobar” and on a number of occasions “the people have been upon the verge of a water famine”. Government-constructed tanks relying on rainfall was the principal means of household supply and the watering of stock, supplemented by “small tanks sunk in the ground” beside many of the houses.

A description of Cobar published in April 1888 noted that “the houses generally are substantially built; many of them being of brick”, with a number of “weather-board and iron buildings and some adobe or clay houses” scattered throughout the town. The courthouse was described as “a handsome brick structure in Barton-street” with a gaol next to it.  The township had nine hotels, “the principal ones being the Cobar and the Commercial”, and two banks, “the Commercial and the Joint Stock”. The writer was of the opinion that “Cobar owes its existence as a town largely to the Great Cobar Copper Mine, although the pastoral properties have also contributed in a great measure to make it a fairly prosperous inland settlement”.

Several fine heritage buildings from the late 1880s/early 1900s settlement are still in existence, including the Great Western Hotel (1898), claimed  to have the longest verandah (at 91 metres) in New South Wales, the Cobar Post Office (1885), the Cobar Court House (1887) and Court House Hotel (1895) in Barton Street, as well as the Cobar Heritage and Visitor Information Centre, located in the former Mines Office (1910). On Hillston Road southeast out of town is Fort Bourke Hill, which affords a view of the town, as well as the historic Towser's Huts, a series of stone miners' cottages dating back as early as the 1890s, possibly even the 1870s, and built by an Italian miner by the name of Antonio Tozzi.

At its peak, Cobar had a population of 10,000. It also became the regional centre for nearby mining villages such as Canbelego and Mount Drysdale. However, copper mining operations slowed in 1920, and by the 1930s the town's population had dropped to little over 1,000, only to rise again and stabilise at around 3,500 through the 1970s and early 1980s. Copper mining was intermittent until 1965 when full-time operations resumed. In the 1980s, gold, silver, lead and zinc were discovered in the area, which led to a further population increase. The town's current positive economic development is due to the affluence of the mining boom. Three important mining belts are operational in the Cobar area: the Cobar belt, the Canbelego belt and the Girilambone belt. Visits to mine sites may be arranged through the Cobar Heritage and Visitor Information Centre overlooking the open cut mine. The Festival of the Miners' Ghost, held during the last weekend in October, is a festival celebrating the spirits of the old miners.

The area of Cobar also includes the now empty sites of the former villages of Wrightville and Dapville, and the informal settlement of Cornish Town. Further away, but at locations now within the area of Cobar, are the empty sites of two other former mining settlements, Illewong and Elouera. There was also a village site at The Peak, proclaimed in 1897.

Heritage listings 
Cobar has a number of heritage-listed sites, including:
 Nyngan-Cobar railway: Cobar railway station
 47 Linsley Street: Cobar Post Office
Nyngan Road (Barrier Highway): Cobar Visitor's Centre / Great Cobar Heritage Centre (also known as Cobar Pastoral & Mining Museum; Mining Administration Offices, Great Cobar Mines)
Nyngan Road (Barrier Highway): Mines Office (former)

New Occidental Hotel fire 
The New Occidental Hotel was a pub located on the edge of town and was built in 1879; it was known as the Star Hotel at that time. It became a significant local spot for miners as well as a common meeting place for groups and clubs in the area. In August 2014 a fire engulfed the building and resulted in the death of a firefighter who died of his injuries at Dubbo Base Hospital.

Population
According to the 2016 census of Population, there were 3,990 people in Cobar.
 Aboriginal and Torres Strait Islander people made up 11.8% of the population. 
 78.5% of people were born in Australia and 83.4% of people only spoke English at home.
 The most common responses for religion were Catholic 33.8%, No Religion 18.9% and Anglican 17.1%.

Economy
The Cobar economy relies heavily on trade with the local mines and their employees, and consequently on world metal prices and hence is subject to great fluctuations. During 2008, after a fall of 75% in world zinc prices, one local mine cut 540 of its 655 jobs, with flow-on effects felt by many other businesses. Over the course of that year Cobar's workforce reduced by 10%. The town has increasing benefit from being the seat of the local government area. Cobar has two primary schools, a high school, an activities youth centre and a 31-bed hospital for acute care.

Cobar Quid 
The local council supports a local currency called Cobar Quid. Established in 2003 by the Cobar Business Association Inc. (CBA),  Cobar Quid is a currency that encourages its residents to shop locally. This local currency is a minted medallion that can be exchanged for goods and services with accepting local businesses.

The CBA sells the coins to the local business in values of $5, $10, $20 and $50 values, and the medallions are minted by the Royal Australian Mint.

Business can redeem the medallions for cash which is controlled by the Cobar Shire Council.

Climate
Cobar has a semi-arid climate (Köppen climate classification BSh) with hot summers and cool winters. It has a median annual rainfall of 390mm. Rainfall is extremely variable, particularly in late summer and early spring. The highest rain falls have been in excess of 200mm in any one month. Rainfall is generally only about 4 days per month. Very sunny, the area receives 163.6 days of bright clear skies per year.

The average relative humidity in Cobar during the summer is about 30% in the afternoon and about 50% at 9am. In winter it is about 45% at 3pm, and about 75% at 9am. 

Annual mean wind speed at 9am and 3 pm is about 12.2 km/h with lesser speeds on winter mornings.

Notable people
Lilliane Brady, mayor for over 20 years and the longest-serving female mayor in NSW history
 Nik Kosef, former professional rugby league footballer for the Manly-Warringah Sea Eagles, 1996 premiership player, NSW & Australia representative
Robert William Rankin, commander of HMAS Yarra (U77) in 1942, namesake of HMAS Rankin (SSG 78) commissioned in 2003.
 Ernie Toshack, cricketer, member of Bradman's Invincibles
Dora Birtles, novelist and writer.

Gallery

Transport

Train and Bus Services 
NSW TrainLink operates a coach service from Dubbo. The train line through Cobar is today used primarily for industrial train services.
See Cobar railway line.

Airport 
Cobar Airport is a small, local airport located 5.6 km southwest of town.

References

External links

Cobar Shire Council

 
Mining towns in New South Wales
Populated places established in 1870
Cobar Shire
1870 establishments in Australia